The Brazil national korfball team is managed by the Federaçao Corfebol Estado Rio de Janeiro (FCERJ), representing Brazil in korfball international competitions.

Tournament history

References

National korfball teams
Korfball
Korfball in Brazil